Ancilla eburnea is a species of sea snail, a marine gastropod mollusk in the family Ancillariidae, the olives.

Description

Distribution

References

External links
 Syntype at MNHN, Paris
 Deshayes G.P. (1830–1832). Encyclopédie méthodique ou par ordre de matières. Histoire naturelle des Vers et Mollusques. Vol. 2, part 1: i–vi, 1–256 [Livraison 101, 1 Feb 1830; part 2: 1–144 [Livraison 101, 1 Feb. 1830], 145–594 [Livraison 102, 29 Sept. 1832]. Vol. 3: 595–1152]
 Sowerby G.B. II (1859). Monograph of the genus Ancillaria. In: G.B. Sowerby II (ed.), Thesaurus Conchyliorum, vol. 3(19): 57–67, pl. 211–214. London, privately published

eburnea
Gastropods described in 1830